Oluremi Oyo was a Nigerian journalist.

Early life and education
Remi Oyo was born on 12 October 1952 in Ilorin, Kwara State, North Central Nigeria. She attended St. James’ Catholic Primary School in Ilorin and St. Louis Secondary School in Bompai, Kano State. She attended the University of Lagos earning a bachelor's degree in Mass Communication and Journalism. She got a post graduate Diploma in International Relations at the Nigerian Institute of International Affairs. She further obtained a master's degree in International Relations at the University of Kent, Canterbury in the United Kingdom.

Career
She was a Nigerian veteran journalist Along the professional line, she was appointed Senior Special Assistant/Spokesperson, (Media and Publicity) to the then Nigeria's President Olusegun Obasanjo in 2003. She also got reappointed in 2007 and was adjudged to have served well in that capacity. In the media industry, she was dubbed a dedicated and amiable media guru. Her career in journalism began as a reporter in 1973 with the Nigerian Broadcasting Corporation NBC, currently, the Federal Radio Corporation of Nigeria (FRCN). Then, she joined NAN as a Desk Editor in 1981. She rose to become its Principal Editor. She was said to be the first woman to attain such a high position in NAN before she eventually took her exit in 1985.

From NAN, she joined the Inter Press Service News Agency (IPS) as the Nigerian Bureau Chief and later rose to become IPS West African Bureau Chief.

She first served as the Secretary to the Nigerian Guild of Editors (NGE). Later, she was elected by her professional colleagues as the first female to be the President of the NGE. She eventually served two consecutive terms from 1999 to 2003.

Shortly after her time with the former president, she was announced as the managing director of the News Agency of Nigeria same year. She was even acclaimed to have rekindle the flame of professionalism in her management style at the NAN  She served two full terms before eventually moving on.

Former Head of State General Abdulsalami Abubakar, was the first to tout her patriotism when he appointed her to the membership of the 1999 Constitution Drafting Committee. In 2006, she was awarded with a national OON conferred on her by President Olusegun Obasanjo. She later received other awards, such as the National Council of Catholic Women Organisation of Nigeria, Nigerian Institute of Management (NIM), and the Nigerian Institute of Peace Administrators.

Personal life
Married to  Victor Oyo, a BBC-Trained journalist, they had two children, Otome and Okiemuote, and three grandchildren.

Death and burial
At 62, died due to cancer after much battles and treatment in the United Kingdom on October 1, 2014, after losing the battle to save her life. And the news went agog 

Her remains were buried at the Yaba Cemetery, Lagos.

Tributes, awards and recognition
Bemoaning her passage, Otome, her son said  Even her colleagues in the media were not left out of the scores of accolades showered on the woman who had made diverse impact to the Nigerian media  Just as national leaders and others mourn her passage 

Oyo, who was not a member of any gender-based journalism organisations once noted that she was of the view that one's professional actions and conducts would speak for the person regardless of whether the person is a male or a female. In fact she always addressed herself as a ‘pressman’.

Even co-women in her Church, the National Council of Catholic Women Organisation of Nigeria once offered her a merit award reiterated in one of the news reports after her demise 

 Recipient, National Council of Catholic Women Organisation of Nigeria merit award. 
 Fellow of the Nigerian Guild of Editors (NGE), the Nigerian Institute of Management (NIM), and the Nigerian Institute of Public Administrators
 Oyo was awarded the national award of Officer of the Order of Niger, OON, in 2006.
 Senior Special Assistant to President Olusegun Obasanjo for media and publicity.

See also
Olusegun Obasanjo
Moji Makanjuola

References

1952 births
2014 deaths
Yoruba journalists
Nigerian newspaper journalists
People from Ilorin
Deaths from cancer in the United Kingdom
Officers of the Order of the Niger
University of Lagos alumni
Alumni of the University of Kent
Burials at Yaba Cemetery
Nigerian women journalists
20th-century journalists
21st-century journalists